Drew Robert Larman (born May 15, 1985) is an American former professional ice hockey player who played 26 games for the Florida Panthers and Boston Bruins of the National Hockey League (NHL).

Playing career
As a youth, Larman played in the 1999 Quebec International Pee-Wee Hockey Tournament with the Detroit Honeybaked minor ice hockey team.

Undrafted, Larman played in the OHL with the Sarnia Sting and the Memorial Cup Championship team, the 2005 London Knights.

On September 25, 2005, Larman was signed by the Florida Panthers as a free agent. Drew made his professional debut with the Panthers affiliates, the Florida Everblades of the ECHL and the Rochester Americans of the AHL, in the 2005-06 season.

Larman made his NHL debut the following 2006-07 season with the Panthers, playing in 16 games. Drew then spent the next two seasons playing primarily for Rochester.

On July 13, 2009, Larman signed a one-year contract with the Boston Bruins. He was assigned to start the 2009–10 season, in the AHL with affiliate the Providence Bruins. In a checking-line role, Larman added 6 goals and 12 points in 55 games with Providence, while also featuring in 4 scoreless games in a recall to the Boston Bruins.

As a free agent and with little NHL interest, Larman belatedly signed a one-year contract in the ECHL with his first professional club, the Florida Everblades on November 11, 2010. Larman played in 57 games with the Everblades, adding little offense with 11 points to draw a close to his professional playing career at the conclusion of the 2010–11 season.

After Hockey
Drew Larman now works as a Yoga instructor in Fort Myers, Florida.

Career statistics

References

External links
 

1985 births
Living people
American men's ice hockey centers
Boston Bruins players
Florida Everblades players
Florida Panthers players
Ice hockey players from Michigan
London Knights players
People from Canton, Michigan
Providence Bruins players
Rochester Americans players
Sarnia Sting players
Undrafted National Hockey League players